Dan Harris (born August 3, 1979) is a Canadian New Democratic Party politician, who represented the riding of Scarborough Southwest from 2011 to 2015. He served as the NDP's Critic for Post-Secondary Education.

Background
Harris grew up in east end Toronto. Before being elected, he worked as an IT technician and "Site Lead for VoIP Services and Implementation" at the Kearl Oil Sands Project for Unified Systems Group. He has previously worked at the University of Toronto Students' Union as D.R.O. for their March 2010 Student Elections. As Web Coordinator at the Make-A-Wish Foundation in the summer of 2008. As a Manager of the Ontario NDP Fundraising PhoneBank in 2007–08. As the Support Team Leader at Web Networks 2001–2006 (part-time from 2005 to 2006 while attending classes). As a C.S.R. Telerep at Answer Plus (an inbound call centre) in 1999–2000. Harris also worked as a Jr. Assistant and Assistant at N.Y.A.D. Not Your Average Daycare from 1995 to 1999.

His father David Harris was a teacher in Scarborough for 28 years until he retired in 2015. His family has a military tradition, since his great-grandfather served in both world wars. His grandmother was in the Canadian Women's Army Corps. His great-uncle, Bill Riley, was in the service in the Second World War and served in Europe.

Education
Harris attended French language schools in Toronto until college, graduating from elementary school at École George Étienne Cartier in Toronto and École Secondaire Catholique Mgr-de-Charbonnel in North Toronto for secondary school. He also attended Seneca College, studying computer programming and analysis. In the fall of 2016 he took a graphic design program at Concordia University.

Politics
Harris first ran for office during the 2000 election in Scarborough Southwest, placing fourth behind Liberal incumbent Tom Wappel. He tried again in the 2004 and 2006 elections, and also ran for Ward 35 in the 2006 Toronto municipal elections. Harris did not contest the 2008 federal election, but tried again in 2011—this time defeating Liberal incumbent Michelle Simson.

Harris was named Deputy Critic for Science and Technology on June 2, 2011. In the summer of 2012 Harris was named Deputy Industry Critic then on August 9, 2013, he became the Critic for Post-Secondary Education.

In February 2015 Harris was among a group of NDP MPs accused by the Board of Internal Economy (BOIE) of misspending taxpayers dollars by funding NDP satellite offices after the 2011 election. Harris was initially ordered to pay back $141,467 to Canadian taxpayers. The NDP indicated its intention to challenge the ruling in federal court. In December 2015 Harris was exonerated by the House of Commons after providing proof that the Liberal and Conservative dominated BOIE had improperly charged him for staff working in his constituency office doing parliamentary work.

In the 2015 Canadian federal election, Harris lost his riding to former Toronto Police Chief Bill Blair.

Electoral record

References

External links

 http://www.backblast.net/pdf/ndp_experience.pdf

1979 births
Members of the House of Commons of Canada from Ontario
New Democratic Party MPs
Living people
People from Scarborough, Toronto
Politicians from Toronto
21st-century Canadian politicians
Seneca College alumni